

Events

Pre-1600
43 BC – Marcus Tullius Cicero is assassinated in Formia on orders of Marcus Antonius. 
 574 – Byzantine Emperor Justin II, suffering recurring seizures of insanity, adopts his general Tiberius and proclaims him as Caesar.
 927 – The Sajid emir of Adharbayjan, Yusuf ibn Abi'l-Saj is defeated and captured by the Qarmatians near Kufa.

1601–1900
1703 – The Great Storm of 1703, the greatest windstorm ever recorded in the southern part of Great Britain, makes landfall. Winds gust up to 120 mph, and 9,000 people die.
1724 – Tumult of Thorn: Religious unrest is followed by the execution of nine Protestant citizens and the mayor of Thorn (Toruń) by Polish authorities.
1732 – The Royal Opera House opens at Covent Garden, London, England.
1776 – Gilbert du Motier, Marquis de Lafayette, arranges to enter the American military as a major general.
1787 – Delaware becomes the first state to ratify the United States Constitution.
1837 – The Battle of Montgomery's Tavern, the only battle of the Upper Canada Rebellion, takes place in Toronto, where the rebels are quickly defeated.
1842 – First concert of the New York Philharmonic, founded by Ureli Corelli Hill.

1901–present
1904 – Comparative fuel trials begin between warships  and : Spiteful was the first warship powered solely by fuel oil, and the trials led to the obsolescence of coal in ships of the Royal Navy.
1917 – World War I: The United States declares war on Austria-Hungary.
1922 – The Parliament of Northern Ireland votes to remain a part of the United Kingdom and not unify with Southern Ireland.
1930 – W1XAV in Boston, Massachusetts telecasts video from the CBS radio orchestra program, The Fox Trappers. The telecast also includes the first television advertisement in the United States, for I.J. Fox Furriers, which also sponsored the radio show.
1932 – German-born Swiss physicist Albert Einstein is granted an American visa.
1936 – Australian cricketer Jack Fingleton becomes the first player to score centuries in four consecutive Test innings.
1941 – World War II: Attack on Pearl Harbor: The Imperial Japanese Navy carries out a surprise attack on the United States Pacific Fleet and its defending Army and Marine air forces at Pearl Harbor, Hawaii. (For Japan's near-simultaneous attacks on Eastern Hemisphere targets, see December 8.)
1942 – World War II: British commandos conduct Operation Frankton, a raid on shipping in Bordeaux harbour.
1944 – An earthquake along the coast of Wakayama Prefecture in Japan causes a tsunami which kills 1,223 people.
1946 – A fire at the Winecoff Hotel in Atlanta, Georgia kills 119 people, the deadliest hotel fire in U.S. history.
1949 – Chinese Civil War: The Government of the Republic of China moves from Nanjing to Taipei, Taiwan.
1962 – Prince Rainier III of Monaco revises the principality's constitution, devolving some of his power to advisory and legislative councils.
1963 – Instant replay makes its debut during the Army-Navy football game in Philadelphia, Pennsylvania, United States.
1965 – Pope Paul VI and Patriarch Athenagoras I simultaneously revoke mutual excommunications that had been in place since 1054.
1971 – The Battle of Sylhet is fought between the Pakistani military and the Mukti Bahini.
  1971   – Pakistan President Yahya Khan announces the formation of a coalition government with Nurul Amin as Prime Minister and Zulfikar Ali Bhutto as Deputy Prime Minister.
1972 – Apollo 17, the last Apollo moon mission, is launched. The crew takes the photograph known as The Blue Marble as they leave the Earth.
1982 – In Texas, Charles Brooks, Jr., becomes the first person to be executed by lethal injection in the United States.
  1982   – The Senior Road Tower collapses in less than 17 seconds.  Five workers on the tower are killed and three workers on a building nearby are injured.
1983 – An Iberia Airlines Boeing 727 collides with an Aviaco DC-9 in dense fog while the two airliners are taxiing down the runway at Madrid–Barajas Airport, killing 93 people.
1987 – Pacific Southwest Airlines Flight 1771, a British Aerospace 146-200A, crashes near Paso Robles, California, killing all 43 on board, after a disgruntled passenger shoots his ex-boss traveling on the flight, then shoots both pilots and steers the plane into the ground.
1988 – The 6.8  Armenian earthquake shakes the northern part of the country with a maximum MSK intensity of X (Devastating), killing 25,000–50,000 and injuring 31,000–130,000.
1993 – Long Island Rail Road shooting: Passenger Colin Ferguson murders six people and injures 19 others on the LIRR in Nassau County, New York.
1995 – The Galileo spacecraft arrives at Jupiter, a little more than six years after it was launched by Space Shuttle Atlantis during Mission STS-34.
  1995   – Khabarovsk United Air Group Flight 3949 crashes into the Bo-Dzhausa Mountain, killing 98.
  1995   – An Air Saint Martin (now Air Caraïbes) Beechcraft 1900 crashes near the Haitian commune of Belle Anse, killing 20.
2003 – The Conservative Party of Canada is officially registered, following the merger of the Canadian Alliance and the Progressive Conservative Party of Canada.
2005 – Rigoberto Alpizar, a passenger on American Airlines Flight 924 who allegedly claimed to have a bomb, is shot and killed by a team of U.S. federal air marshals at Miami International Airport.
2015 – The JAXA probe Akatsuki successfully enters orbit around Venus five years after the first attempt.
2016 – Pakistan International Airlines Flight 661, a domestic passenger flight from Chitral to Islamabad, operated by ATR-42-500 crashes near Havelian, killing all 47 on board.

Births

Pre-1600
 521 – Columba, Irish missionary, monk, and saint (d. 597)
 903 – Abd al-Rahman al-Sufi, Persian astronomer and author (d. 986)
 967 – Abū-Sa'īd Abul-Khayr, Persian Sufi poet (d. 1049)
1302 – Azzone Visconti, Italian nobleman (d. 1339)
1532 – Louis I, German nobleman and politician (d. 1605)
1545 – Henry Stuart, English-Scottish husband of Mary, Queen of Scots (d. 1567)
1561 – Kikkawa Hiroie, Japanese daimyō (d. 1625)
1595 – Injo of Joseon, Korean king (d. 1649)
1598 – Gian Lorenzo Bernini, Italian sculptor and painter (d. 1680)

1601–1900
1643 – Giovanni Battista Falda, Italian architect and engraver (d. 1678)
1637 – Bernardo Pasquini, Italian organist and composer (d. 1710)
1764 – Claude Victor-Perrin, French general and politician (d. 1841)
1784 – Allan Cunningham, Scottish author and poet (d. 1842)
1791 – Ferenc Novák, Hungarian-Slovene priest and poet (d. 1836)
1792 – Abraham Jacob van der Aa, Dutch author and academic (d. 1857)
1801 – Johann Nestroy, Austrian actor and playwright (d. 1862)
1810 – Josef Hyrtl, Hungarian-Austrian anatomist and biologist (d. 1894)
  1810   – Theodor Schwann, German physiologist and biologist (d. 1882)
1823 – Leopold Kronecker, Polish-German mathematician and academic (d. 1891)
1838 – Thomas Bent, Australian businessman and politician, 22nd Premier of Victoria (d. 1909)
1860 – Joseph Cook, English-born Australian politician, 6th Prime Minister of Australia (d. 1947)
1861 – Henri Mathias Berthelot, French general during World War I (d. 1931)
1862 – Paul Adam, French author (d. 1920)
1863 – Felix Calonder, Swiss soldier and politician, 36th President of the Swiss Confederation (d. 1952)
  1863   – Pietro Mascagni, Italian composer and conductor (d. 1945)
  1863   – Richard Warren Sears, American businessman, co-founded Sears (d. 1914)
1869 – Frank Laver, Australian cricketer (d. 1919)
1873 – Willa Cather, American novelist, short story writer, and poet (d. 1947)
1878 – Akiko Yosano,  Japanese author, poet, pioneering feminist, pacifist, and social reformer (d. 1942)
1879 – Rudolf Friml, Czech-American pianist, composer, and academic (d. 1972)
1884 – John Carpenter, American sprinter (d. 1933)
1885 – Mason Phelps, American golfer (d. 1945)
  1885   – Peter Sturholdt, American boxer and painter (d. 1919)
1887 – Ernst Toch, Austrian-American composer and songwriter (d. 1964)
1888 – Joyce Cary, Irish novelist (d. 1957)
  1888   – Hamilton Fish III, American captain and politician (d. 1991)
1892 – Stuart Davis, American painter and academic (d. 1964)
1893 – Fay Bainter, American actress (d. 1968)
  1893   – Hermann Balck, German general (d. 1982)
1894 – Freddie Adkins, English author and illustrator (d. 1986)
1900 – Kateryna Vasylivna Bilokur, Ukrainian folk artist (d. 1961)

1901–present
1902 – Hilda Taba, Estonian architect, author, and educator (d. 1967)
1903 – Danilo Blanuša, Croatian mathematician, physicist, and academic (d. 1987)
1904 – Clarence Nash, American voice actor and singer (d. 1985)
1905 – Gerard Kuiper, Dutch-American astronomer and academic (d. 1973)
1906 – Erika Fuchs, German translator (d. 2005)
1907 – Fred Rose, Polish-Canadian politician and spy (d. 1983)
1909 – Nikola Vaptsarov, Bulgarian poet and author (d. 1942)
1910 – Duncan McNaughton, Canadian high jumper and geologist (d. 1998)
  1910   – Louis Prima, American singer-songwriter, trumpet player, and actor (d. 1978)
1912 – Daniel Jones, Welsh captain and composer (d. 1993)
1913 – Kersti Merilaas, Estonian author and poet (d. 1986)
1915 – Leigh Brackett, American author and screenwriter (d. 1978)
  1915   – Eli Wallach, American actor (d. 2014)
1920 – Tatamkhulu Afrika, South African poet and author (d. 2002)
  1920   – Fiorenzo Magni, Italian cyclist (d. 2012)
  1920   – Walter Nowotny, Austrian-German soldier and pilot (d. 1944)
1921 – Pramukh Swami Maharaj, Indian guru and scholar (d. 2016)
1923 – Intizar Hussain, Indian-Pakistani author and scholar (d. 2016)
  1923   – Ted Knight, American actor and comedian (d. 1986)
1924 – John Love, Zimbabwean race car driver (d. 2005)
  1924   – Mary Ellen Estill. American mathematician (d. 2013)
  1924   – Mário Soares, Portuguese historian, lawyer, and politician, 17th President of Portugal (d. 2017)
  1924   – Bent Fabric, Danish pianist and composer (d. 2020)
1925 – Hermano da Silva Ramos, French-Brazilian race car driver
1926 – William John McNaughton, American bishop (d. 2020)
1927 – Jack S. Blanton, American businessman and philanthropist (d. 2013)
  1927   – Helen Watts, Welsh opera singer (d. 2009)
1928 – Noam Chomsky, American linguist and philosopher
  1928   – Mickey Thompson, American race car driver (d. 1988)
1930 – Christopher Nicole, Guyanese-English author
  1930   – Hal Smith, American baseball player (d. 2020)
1931 – Allan B. Calhamer, American game designer, created Diplomacy (d. 2013)
  1931   – Bobby Osborne, American bluegrass singer and musician 
1932 – Ellen Burstyn, American actress 
  1932   – Oktay Ekşi, Turkish journalist and politician 
  1932   – Rosemary Rogers, American journalist and author (d. 2019)
  1932   – J. B. Sumarlin, Indonesian economist and politician, 17th Indonesian Minister of Finance (d. 2020)
  1932   – Bobby Whitton, Australian rugby league player (d. 2008)
1933 – Krsto Papić, Croatian director and screenwriter (d. 2013)
1935 – Armando Manzanero, Mexican musician, singer and composer (d. 2020)
1937 – Thad Cochran, American lawyer and politician (d. 2019)
  1937   – Stan Boardman, English comedian
1940 – Gerry Cheevers, Canadian ice hockey player and coach
1941 – Melba Pattillo Beals, American journalist and activist
1942 – Harry Chapin, American singer-songwriter and guitarist (d. 1981)
1942 – Reginald F. Lewis, American Business Tycoon and Philanthropist (d. 1993)
  1942   – Alex Johnson, American baseball player (d. 2015)
  1942   – Peter Tomarken, American game show host and producer (d. 2006)
1943 – Susan Isaacs, American author and screenwriter
  1943   – Nick Katz, American mathematician and academic
  1943   – Bernard C. Parks, American police officer and politician
  1943   – John Bennett Ramsey, American businessman and pilot
1944 – Daniel Chorzempa, American organist and composer
  1944   – Miroslav Macek, Czech dentist and politician
1947 – Johnny Bench, American baseball player and sportscaster
  1947   – Anne Fine, English author
  1947   – James Keach, American actor, producer, and director
  1947   – Garry Unger, Canadian ice hockey player and sportscaster
1948 – Gary Morris, American country singer-songwriter and actor 
  1948   – Tony Thomas, American screenwriter and producer
1949 – James Rivière, Italian sculptor and jeweler
  1949   – Tom Waits, American singer-songwriter, guitarist, and actor
1950 – Ron Hynes, Canadian singer-songwriter and guitarist (d. 2015)
1952 – Susan Collins, American politician, senior senator of Maine
  1952   – Eckhard Märzke, German footballer and manager
1954 – Mary Fallin, American businesswoman and politician, 27th Governor of Oklahoma
  1955   – John Watkins, Australian educator and politician, 14th Deputy Premier of New South Wales
1956 – Larry Bird, American basketball player and coach
  1956   – Chuy Bravo, Mexican-American comedian and actor (d. 2019)
  1956   – Anna Soubry, British politician
1957 – Geoff Lawson, Australian cricketer, coach, and sportscaster
  1957   – Tom Winsor, English lawyer and civil servant
1957 – Tijjani Muhammad-Bande, Nigerian career-diplomat, President of the United Nations General Assembly (2019)
1958 – Tim Butler, English bass player and songwriter 
  1958   – Rick Rude, American wrestler and sportscaster (d. 1999)
1959 – Saleem Yousuf, Pakistani cricketer
1960 – Craig Scanlon, English guitarist and songwriter 
1962 – Alain Blondel, French decathlete
  1962   – Jeffrey Donaldson, Northern Irish politician
  1962   – Imad Mughniyah, Lebanese activist (d. 2008)
1963 – Theo Snelders, Dutch footballer and coach
  1963   – Katsuya Terada, Japanese illustrator
  1963   – Barbara Weathers, American R&B/soul singer
1964 – Hugo Blick, English filmmaker
  1964   – Patrick Fabian, American actor
  1964   – Peter Laviolette, American ice hockey player and coach
1965 – Deborah Bassett, Australian rower
  1965   – Colin Hendry, Scottish footballer and manager
  1965   – Jeffrey Wright, American actor
1966 – C. Thomas Howell, American actor, director, producer, and screenwriter
  1966   – Shinichi Ito, Japanese motorcycle racer
  1966   – Kazue Itoh, Japanese actress
  1966   – Andres Kasekamp, Canadian-Estonian historian and academic
  1966   – Louise Post, American singer-songwriter and guitarist
1967 – Mark Geyer, Australian rugby league player and sportscaster
  1967   – Tino Martinez, American baseball player, coach, and sportscaster
  1967   – Nina Turner, American politician
1971 – Vladimir Akopian, Azerbaijani-Armenian chess player
1972 – Hermann Maier, Austrian skier
  1972   – Tammy Lynn Sytch, American wrestler and manager
1973 – İbrahim Kutluay, Turkish basketball player
  1973   – Hack Meyers, American wrestler and trainer (d. 2015)
  1973   – Terrell Owens, American football player and actor
  1973   – Fabien Pelous, French rugby player and coach
  1973   – Damien Rice, Irish singer-songwriter, musician and record producer
1974 – Nicole Appleton, Canadian singer and actress 
  1974   – Manuel Martínez Gutiérrez, Spanish shot putter and actor
1975 – Jamie Clapham, English footballer and coach
1976 – Alan Faneca, American football player
  1976   – Ivan Franceschini, Italian footballer
  1976   – Georges Laraque, Canadian ice hockey player and politician
  1976   – Derek Ramsay, Filipino-British actor, model and television personality
  1976   – Sunny Sweeney, American singer-songwriter and guitarist
  1976   – Benoît Tréluyer, French race car driver
1977 – Eric Chavez, American baseball player and sportscaster
  1977   – Luke Donald, English golfer
  1977   – Dominic Howard, English drummer and producer 
1978 – Shiri Appleby, American actress, director, and producer
  1978   – Suzannah Lipscomb, English historian, academic and television presenter
1979 – Sara Bareilles, American singer-songwriter, pianist, and actress
  1979   – Lampros Choutos, Greek-Italian footballer
  1979   – Ayako Fujitani, Japanese actress and screenwriter
1980 – Dan Bilzerian, American poker player and internet celebrity
  1980   – John Terry, English footballer
1983 – Mike Mucitelli, American mixed martial artist
1984 – Aaron Gray, American basketball player
  1984   – Robert Kubica, Polish race car driver
  1984   – Milan Michálek, Czech ice hockey player
  1984   – Luca Rigoni, Italian footballer
1985 – Jon Moxley, American wrestler
1986 – Billy Horschel, American golfer
  1986   – Nita Strauss, American guitarist
1987 – Aaron Carter, American singer-songwriter, rapper, dancer, and actor (d. 2022)
1988 – Nathan Adrian, American swimmer
  1988   – Angelina Gabueva, Russian tennis player
  1988   – Emily Browning, Australian actress and singer
1989 – Kyle Hendricks, American baseball player
  1989   – Alessandro Marchi, Italian footballer
  1989   – Nicholas Hoult, English actor
1990 – David Goffin, Belgian tennis player
  1990   – Aleksandr Menkov, Russian long jumper
  1990   – Yasiel Puig, Cuban baseball player
  1990   – Urszula Radwańska, Polish tennis player
1991 – Eugenio Pisani, Italian race car driver
1993 – Rahama Sadau, Nigerian actress
1994 – Pete Alonso, American baseball player
  1994   – Yuzuru Hanyu, Japanese figure skater
1997 – Abi Harrison, Scottish footballer
  1997   – Tommy Nelson, American actor
1998 – Tony Yike Yang, Canadian pianist

Deaths

Pre-1600
43 BC – Cicero, Roman philosopher, lawyer, and politician (b. 106 BC)
 283 – Eutychian, pope of the Catholic Church
 881 – Anspert, archbishop of Milan
 983 – Otto II, Holy Roman Emperor (b. 955)
1254 – Innocent IV, pope of the Catholic Church (b. 1195)
1279 – Bolesław V, High Duke of Poland (b. 1226)
1295 – Gilbert de Clare, 7th Earl of Gloucester, English officer (b. 1243)
1383 – Wenceslaus I, duke of Luxembourg (b. 1337)
1498 – Alexander Hegius von Heek, German poet (b. 1433)
1562 – Adrian Willaert, Dutch-Italian composer and educator (b. 1490)

1601–1900
1649 – Charles Garnier, French missionary and saint (b. 1606)
1672 – Richard Bellingham, English-American lawyer and politician, 8th Governor of the Massachusetts Bay Colony (b. 1592)
1680 – Peter Lely, Dutch-English painter (b. 1618)
1683 – Algernon Sidney, English philosopher and politician, Lord Warden of the Cinque Ports (b. 1623)
1723 – Jan Santini Aichel, Czech architect, designed the Pilgrimage Church of Saint John of Nepomuk and Karlova Koruna Chateau (b. 1677)
1725 – Florent Carton Dancourt, French actor and playwright (b. 1661)
1772 – Martín Sarmiento, Spanish monk, scholar, and author (b. 1695)
1775 – Charles Saunders, English admiral and politician (b. 1715)
1793 – Joseph Bara, French soldier and drummer (b. 1779)
1803 – Küçük Hüseyin Pasha, Turkish admiral and politician (b. 1757)
1815 – Michel Ney, German-French general (b. 1769)
1817 – William Bligh, English admiral and politician, 4th Governor of New South Wales (b. 1745)
1837 – Robert Nicoll, Scottish poet (b.1814)
1842 – Thomas Hamilton, Scottish philosopher and author (b. 1789)
1874 – Constantin von Tischendorf, German theologian, scholar, and academic (b. 1815)
1879 – Jón Sigurðsson, Icelandic scholar and politician, 1st Speaker of the Parliament of Iceland (b. 1811)
1891 – Arthur Blyth, English-Australian politician, 9th Premier of South Australia (b. 1823)
1894 – Ferdinand de Lesseps, French businessman and diplomat, co-developed the Suez Canal (b. 1805)
1899 – Juan Luna, Filipino painter and sculptor (b. 1857)

1901–present
1902 – Thomas Nast, German-American cartoonist (b. 1840)
1906 – Élie Ducommun, Swiss journalist and educator, Nobel Prize laureate (b. 1833)
1913 – Luigi Oreglia di Santo Stefano, Italian cardinal (b. 1828)
1917 – Ludwig Minkus, Austrian violinist and composer (b. 1826)
1918 – Frank Wilson, English-Australian politician, 9th Premier of Western Australia (b. 1859)
1941 – Attack on Pearl Harbor:
                Mervyn S. Bennion, American captain (b. 1887)
                Frederick Curtice Davis, American sailor (b. 1915)
                Julius Ellsberry, American sailor (b. 1921)
                John C. England, American sailor (b. 1920)
                Edwin J. Hill, American sailor (b. 1894)
                Ralph Hollis, American sailor (b. 1906)
                Herbert C. Jones, American sailor (b. 1918)
                Isaac C. Kidd, American admiral (b. 1884)
                Robert Lawrence Leopold, American sailor (b. 1916)
                Herbert Hugo Menges, American sailor (b. 1917)
                Thomas James Reeves, American sailor (b. 1895)
                Aloysius Schmitt, American priest and sailor (b. 1909)
                Robert R. Scott, American sailor (b. 1915)
                Peter Tomich, American sailor (b. 1893)
                Robert Uhlmann, American sailor (b. 1919)
                Franklin Van Valkenburgh, American captain (b. 1888)
                Eldon P. Wyman, American sailor (b. 1917)
1947 – Tristan Bernard, French author and playwright (b. 1866)
  1947   – Nicholas Murray Butler, American philosopher and academic, Nobel Prize laureate (b. 1862)
1949 – Rex Beach, American author, playwright, and water polo player (b. 1877)
1956 – Huntley Gordon, Canadian-American actor (b. 1887)
  1956   – Reşat Nuri Güntekin, Turkish author and playwright (b. 1889)
1960 – Ioannis Demestichas, Greek admiral and politician (b. 1882)
1962 – Kirsten Flagstad, Norwegian opera singer (b. 1895)
1969 – Lefty O'Doul, American baseball player and manager (b. 1897)
  1969   – Eric Portman, English actor (b. 1903)
1970 – Rube Goldberg, American cartoonist, sculptor, and author (b. 1883)
1975 – Thornton Wilder, American novelist and playwright (b. 1897)
  1975   – Hardie Albright, American actor (b. 1903)
1976 – Paul Bragg, American nutritionist (b. 1895)
1977 – Paul Gibb, English cricketer and umpire (b. 1913)
  1977   – Peter Carl Goldmark, Hungarian-American engineer (b. 1906)
  1977   – Georges Grignard, French race car driver (b. 1905)
1978 – Alexander Wetmore, American ornithologist and paleontologist (b. 1886)
1979 – Cecilia Payne-Gaposchkin, English-American astronomer and astrophysicist (b. 1900)
1980 – Darby Crash, American punk rock vocalist and songwriter (b. 1958)
1984 – LeeRoy Yarbrough, American race car driver (b. 1938)
1985 – J. R. Eyerman, American photographer and journalist (b. 1906)
  1985   – Robert Graves, English poet, novelist, critic (b. 1895)
  1985   – Potter Stewart, American soldier and jurist (b. 1915)
1989 – Haystacks Calhoun, American wrestler and actor (b. 1934)
  1989   – Hans Hartung, French-German painter (b. 1904)
1990 – Joan Bennett, American actress (b. 1910)
  1990   – Jean Paul Lemieux, Canadian painter and educator (b. 1904)
1992 – Richard J. Hughes, American politician, 45th Governor of New Jersey, and Chief Justice of the New Jersey Supreme Court (b. 1909)
1993 – Abidin Dino, Turkish-French painter and illustrator (b. 1913)
  1993   – Félix Houphouët-Boigny, Ivoirian physician and politician, 1st President of Ivory Coast (b. 1905)
1995 – Kathleen Harrison, English actress (b. 1892)
1997 – Billy Bremner, Scottish footballer and manager (b. 1942)
1998 – John Addison, English-American composer and conductor (b. 1920)
  1998   – Martin Rodbell, American biochemist and endocrinologist, Nobel Prize laureate (b. 1925)
2003 – Carl F. H. Henry American journalist and theologian (b. 1913)
  2003   – Azie Taylor Morton, American educator and politician, 36th Treasurer of the United States (b. 1933)
2004 – Frederick Fennell, American conductor and educator (b. 1914)
  2004   – Jerry Scoggins, American singer and guitarist (b. 1913)
  2004   – Jay Van Andel, American businessman and philanthropist, co-founded Amway (b. 1924)
2005 – Bud Carson, American football player and coach (b. 1931)
2006 – Jeane Kirkpatrick, American academic and diplomat, 16th United States Ambassador to the United Nations (b. 1926)
2008 – Herbert Hutner, American banker and lawyer (b. 1908)
2010 – Elizabeth Edwards, American lawyer and author (b. 1949)
  2010   – Kari Tapio, Finnish singer (b. 1945)
2011 – Harry Morgan, American actor (b. 1915)
2012 – Roelof Kruisinga, Dutch physician and politician, Dutch Minister of Defence (b. 1922)
  2012   – Ralph Parr, American colonel and pilot (b. 1924)
  2012   – Marty Reisman, American table tennis player and author (b. 1930)
  2012   – Saul Steinberg, American businessman and financier (b. 1939)
2013 – Édouard Molinaro, French actor, director, producer, and screenwriter (b. 1928)
  2013   – Chick Willis, American singer and guitarist (b. 1934)
2014 – Mark Lewis, American author and educator (b. 1954)
  2015   – Gerhard Lenski, American sociologist and academic (b. 1924)
  2015   – Hyron Spinrad, American astronomer and academic (b. 1934)
  2015   – Peter Westbury, English race car driver (b. 1938)
2016 – Junaid Jamshed, Pakistani recording artist, television personality, fashion designer, occasional actor, singer-songwriter and preacher. (b. 1964)
  2016   – Greg Lake, English musician (b. 1947)
  2017   – Steve Reevis, Native American actor (b. 1962)
2019 – Ron Saunders, English football player and manager (b. 1932)
2020 – Dick Allen, American baseball player and tenor (b. 1942)
  2020   – Chuck Yeager, American aviator (b. 1923)

Holidays and observances
Armed Forces Flag Day (India)
Christian feast day:
Aemilianus (Greek Church)
Ambrose
Maria Giuseppa Rossello
Sabinus of Spoleto
December 7 (Eastern Orthodox liturgics)
Eve of the Immaculate Conception-related observances:
Day of the Little Candles, begins after sunset (Colombia)
Flag Base Day (Scientology)
International Civil Aviation Day
National Heroes Day (East Timor)
National Pearl Harbor Remembrance Day (United States)
Spitak Remembrance Day (Armenia)

References

External links

 BBC: On This Day
 
 Historical Events on December 7

Days of the year
December